Ukraine competed at the 2016 Winter Youth Olympics in Lillehammer, Norway from 12 to 21 February 2016.

Some of the athletes later represented Ukraine at the Winter Olympics. Vladyslav Heraskevych (skeleton) competed at the 2018 and 2022 Winter Olympics. Andriy Orlyk (cross-country skiing) represented Ukraine at the 2018 Winter Olympics. Yuliia Krol (cross-country skiing), Ivan Shmuratko (figure skating), Ihor Stakhiv and Andriy Lysetskyy (both luge), Dmytro Mazurchuk (nordic combined) represented Ukraine at the 2022 Winter Olympics.

Medalists

Medalists in mixed NOCs events

Alpine skiing

Boys

Girls

Biathlon

Boys

Girls

Mixed

Cross-country skiing

Boys

Girls

Figure skating

Singles

Couples

Mixed NOC team trophy

Luge

Individual sleds

Mixed team relay

Nordic combined

Skeleton

Ski jumping

Snowboarding

Snowboard cross

Snowboard and ski cross relay

Qualification legend: FA – Qualify to medal round; FB – Qualify to consolation round

See also
Ukraine at the 2016 Summer Olympics

References

2016 in Ukrainian sport
Nations at the 2016 Winter Youth Olympics
2016